Monochamus adamitus is a species of beetle in the family Cerambycidae. It was described by James Thomson in 1857. It is known from Tanzania, Sierra Leone, Angola, Ghana, Mozambique, the Ivory Coast, Senegal, the Democratic Republic of the Congo, Malawi, and Zimbabwe.

Subspecies
 Monochamus adamitus adamitus Thomson, 1857
 Monochamus adamitus gazensis (Dillon & Dillon, 1961)
 Monochamus adamitus nyassensis Gahan, 1888
 Monochamus adamitus pannulatus (Quedenfeldt, 1882)
 Monochamus adamitus proximus Breuning, 1935
 Monochamus adamitus schoutedeni Breuning, 1935

References

adamitus
Beetles described in 1857